Marie Jean Antoine Nicolas de Caritat, Marquis of Condorcet (17 September 1743 – 29 March 1794), known as Nicolas de Condorcet, was a French philosopher and mathematician. His ideas, including support for a liberal economy, free and equal public instruction, constitutional government, and equal rights for women and people of all races, have been said to embody the ideals of the Age of Enlightenment, of which he has been called the "last witness," and Enlightenment rationalism. He died in prison after a period of hiding from the French Revolutionary authorities.

Early years
Condorcet was born in Ribemont (in present-day Aisne), descended from the ancient family of Caritat, who took their title from the town of Condorcet in Dauphiné, of which they were long-time residents. Fatherless at a young age, he was taken care of by his devoutly religious mother who dressed him as a girl till age eight. He was educated at the Jesuit College in Reims and at the Collège de Navarre in Paris, where he quickly showed his intellectual ability and gained his first public distinctions in mathematics. When he was sixteen, his analytical abilities gained the praise of Jean le Rond d'Alembert and Alexis Clairaut; soon, Condorcet would study under d'Alembert.

From 1765 to 1774, he focused on science. In 1765, he published his first work on mathematics, entitled Essai sur le calcul intégral, which was well received, launching his career as a mathematician. He went on to publish more papers, and on 25 February 1769, he was elected to the Académie royale des Sciences.

In 1772, he published another paper on integral calculus. Soon after, he met Jacques Turgot, a French economist, and the two became friends. Turgot became an administrator under King Louis XV in 1772 and Controller-General of Finance under Louis XVI in 1774.

Condorcet worked with Leonhard Euler and Benjamin Franklin. He soon became an honorary member of many foreign academies and philosophic societies, including the American Philosophical Society (1775), the Royal Swedish Academy of Sciences (1785), the American Academy of Arts and Sciences (1792)
and also in Prussia and Russia.

His political ideas, many in congruity with Turgot's, were criticized heavily in the English-speaking world, however, most notably by John Adams who wrote two of his principal works of political philosophy to oppose Turgot's and Condorcet's unicameral legislature and radical democracy.

Early political career
In 1774, Condorcet was appointed inspector general of the Paris mint by Turgot. From this point on, Condorcet shifted his focus from the purely mathematical to philosophy and political matters. In the following years, he took up the defense of human rights in general, and of women's and Blacks' rights in particular (an abolitionist, he became active in the Society of the Friends of the Blacks in the 1780s). He supported the ideals embodied by the newly formed United States, and proposed projects of political, administrative and economic reforms intended to transform France.

In 1776, Turgot was dismissed as Controller General. Consequently, Condorcet submitted his resignation as Inspector General of the Monnaie, but the request was refused, and he continued serving in this post until 1791. Condorcet later wrote Vie de M. Turgot (1786), a biography which spoke fondly of Turgot and advocated Turgot's economic theories. Condorcet continued to receive prestigious appointments: in 1777, he became Permanent Secretary of the Académie des Sciences, holding the post until the abolition of the Académie in 1793; and, in 1782, secretary of the Académie française.

Condorcet's paradox and the Condorcet method

In 1785, Condorcet published his Essay on the Application of Analysis to the Probability of Majority Decisions, one of his most important works.  This work described several now famous results, including Condorcet's jury theorem, which states that if each member of a voting group is more likely than not to make a correct decision, the probability that the highest vote of the group is the correct decision increases as the number of members of the group increases, and Condorcet's paradox, which shows that majority preferences can become intransitive with three or more options – it is possible for a certain electorate to express a preference for A over B, a preference for B over C, and a preference for C over A, all from the same set of ballots.

The paper also outlines a generic Condorcet method, designed to simulate pair-wise elections between all candidates in an election. He disagreed strongly with the alternative method of aggregating preferences put forth by Jean-Charles de Borda (based on summed rankings of alternatives). Condorcet was one of the first to systematically apply mathematics in the social sciences.

Other works
In 1781, Condorcet wrote a pamphlet, Reflections on Negro Slavery, in which he denounced slavery. In 1786, Condorcet worked on ideas for the differential and integral calculus, giving a new treatment of infinitesimals – a work which apparently was never published. In 1789, he published Vie de Voltaire (1789), which agreed with Voltaire in his opposition to the Church. In 1791, Condorcet, along with Sophie de Grouchy, Thomas Paine, Etienne Dumont, Jacques-Pierre Brissot, and Achilles Duchastellet published a brief journal titled Le Républicain, its main goal being the promotion of republicanism and the rejection of constitutional monarchy. The journal's theme was that any sort of monarchy is a threat to freedom no matter who is leading and that liberty is freedom from domination.

In 1795, Condorcet's book Sketch for a Historical Picture of the Progress of the Human Mind was published after his death by his wife Sophie de Grouchy. It dealt with theoretical thought on perfecting the human mind and analyzing intellectual history based on social arithmetic.  Thomas Malthus wrote An Essay on the Principle of Population (1798) partly in response to Condorcet's views on the "perfectibility of society."

French Revolution

Deputy
Condorcet took a leading role when the French Revolution swept France in 1789, hoping for a rationalist reconstruction of society, and championed many liberal causes. As a result, in 1791 he was elected as a Paris representative in the Legislative Assembly, and then became the secretary of the Assembly.

Condorcet was not affiliated with any political party but counted many friends among the Girondins. He distanced himself from them during the National Convention, however, due to his distaste for their factionalism.

In April 1792 Condorcet presented a project for the reformation of the education system, aiming to create a hierarchical system, under the authority of experts, who would work as the guardians of the Enlightenment and who, independent of power, would be the guarantors of public liberties. The project was judged to be contrary to republican and egalitarian virtues, handing the education of the Nation over to an aristocracy of savants, and Condorcet's proposal was not taken up by the Assembly. Several years later, in 1795, when the Thermidorians had gained in strength, the National Convention would adopt an educational plan based on Condorcet's proposal.

He advocated women's suffrage for the new government, writing an article for Journal de la Société de 1789, and by publishing De l'admission des femmes au droit de cité ("For the Admission to the Rights of Citizenship For Women") in 1790.

At the Trial of Louis XVI in December 1792, Condorcet, who opposed the death penalty albeit supporting the trial itself, spoke out against the execution of the King during the public vote at the Convention – he proposed to send the king to work as a slave rower on galley ships.

Condorcet was on the Constitution Committee and was the main author of the Girondin constitutional project. This constitution was not put to a vote. When the Montagnards gained control of the Convention, they wrote their own, the French Constitution of 1793. Condorcet criticized the new work, and as a result, he was branded a traitor. On 3 October 1793, a warrant was issued for Condorcet's arrest.

Arrest and death

The warrant forced Condorcet into hiding. He hid for five (or eight) months in the house of Mme. Vernet, on Rue Servandoni, in Paris. It was there that he wrote Esquisse d'un tableau historique des progrès de l'esprit humain (Sketch for a Historical Picture of the Progress of the Human Spirit), which was published posthumously in 1795 and is considered one of the major texts of the Enlightenment and of historical thought. It narrates the history of civilization as one of progress in the sciences, shows the intimate connection between scientific progress and the development of human rights and justice, and outlines the features of a future rational society entirely shaped by scientific knowledge.

On 25 March 1794 Condorcet, convinced he was no longer safe, left his hideout and attempted to flee Paris. He went to seek refuge at the house of Jean-Baptiste Suard, a friend of his with whom he had resided in 1772, but he was refused on the basis that he would be betrayed by one of their residents. Two days later, he was arrested in Clamart and imprisoned in Bourg-la-Reine (or, as it was known during the Revolution, Bourg-l'Égalité, "Equality Borough" rather than "Queen's Borough") where, after another two days, he was found dead in his cell. The most widely accepted theory is that his friend, Pierre Jean George Cabanis, gave him a poison which he eventually used. However, some historians believe that he may have been murdered (perhaps because he was too loved and respected to be executed). Jean-Pierre Brancourt (in his work L'élite, la mort et la révolution) claims that Condorcet was killed with a mixture of Datura stramonium and opium.

Condorcet was symbolically interred in the Panthéon in 1989, in honour of the bicentennial of the French Revolution and Condorcet's role as a central figure in the Enlightenment.  His coffin, however, was empty as his remains, originally interred in the common cemetery of Bourg-la-Reine, were lost during the nineteenth century.

Family
In 1786 Condorcet married Sophie de Grouchy, who was more than twenty years his junior. Sophie, reckoned one of the most beautiful women of the day, became an accomplished salon hostess as Madame de Condorcet, and also an accomplished translator of Thomas Paine and Adam Smith. She was intelligent and well educated, fluent in both English and Italian. The marriage was a strong one, and Sophie visited her husband regularly while he remained in hiding. Although she began proceedings for divorce in January 1794, it was at the insistence of Condorcet and Cabanis, who wished to protect their property from expropriation and to provide financially for Sophie and their young daughter, Louise 'Eliza' Alexandrine.

Condorcet was survived by his widow and four-year-old Eliza. Sophie died in 1822, never having remarried, and having published all her husband's works between 1801 and 1804. Her work was carried on by Eliza, wife of former United Irishman Arthur O'Connor.  The Condorcet-O'Connors published a revised edition between 1847 and 1849.

Gender equality 

Condorcet's work was mainly focused on a quest for a more egalitarian society. This path led him to think and write about gender equality in the Revolutionary context. In 1790, he published "Sur l'admission des femmes au droit de cité" ("On the Admission of Women to the Rights of Citizenship") in which he strongly advocated for women's suffrage in the new Republic as well as the enlargement of basic political and social rights to include women. One of the most famous Enlightenment thinkers at the time, he was one of the first to make such a radical proposal.

'The rights of men stem exclusively from the fact that they are sentient beings, capable of acquiring moral ideas and of reasoning upon them. Since women have the same qualities, they necessarily also have the same rights. Either no member of the human race has any true rights, or else they all have the same ones; and anyone who votes against the rights of another, whatever his religion, colour or sex, automatically forfeits his own.'

A visionary, he identified gender as a social construction based on perceived differences in sex and rejected biological determinism as being able to explain gender relations in society. He denounced patriarchal norms of oppression, present at every institutional level, and continuously subjugating and marginalising women. Like fellow Enlightenment thinker Jean-Jacques Rousseau in his book Emile ou De l'Education (1762), Condorcet identified education as crucial to the emancipation of individuals. He stated: "I believe that all other differences between men and women are simply the result of education". He saw it as the only solution for women to deconstruct gender roles and promote another kind of masculinity, not based on violence, virility and the subjugation of women but rather on shared attributes such as reason and intelligence. In her book Essays in the Philosophy of Humanism, Hooks calls this new concept "feminine masculinity", "new models of self–assertion that do not require the construction of an enemy 'other,' be it a woman or the symbolic feminine, for them to define themselves against".

Condorcet's whole plea for gender equality is founded on the recognition that the attribution of rights and authority comes from the false assumption that men possess reason and women do not. This is, according to J. Nall, an obvious example of an individual practising and advocating this feminist masculinity. As such, women should enjoy the same fundamental "natural right".

Scholars often disagree on the true impact that Condorcet's work had on pre-modern feminist thinking. His detractors point out that, when he was eventually given some responsibilities in the constitutional drafting process, his convictions did not translate into concrete political action and he made limited efforts to push these issues on the agenda. Some scholars on the other hand, believe that this lack of action is not due to the weakness of his commitment but rather to the political atmosphere at the time and the absence of political appetite for gender equality on the part of decision-makers. Along with authors such as Mary Wollstonecraft, d'Alembert or Olympe de Gouges, Condorcet made a lasting contribution to the pre-feminist debate.

The Idea of Progress 

Condorcet's Sketch for a Historical Picture of the Progress of the Human Spirit (1795) was perhaps the most influential formulation of the idea of progress ever written. It made the Idea of Progress a central concern of Enlightenment thought. He argued that expanding knowledge in the natural and social sciences would lead to an ever more just world of individual freedom, material affluence, and moral compassion. He argued for three general propositions: that the past revealed an order that could be understood in terms of the progressive development of human capabilities, showing that humanity's "present state, and those through which it has passed, are a necessary constitution of the moral composition of humankind"; that the progress of the natural sciences must be followed by progress in the moral and political sciences "no less certain, no less secure from political revolutions"; that social evils are the result of ignorance and error rather than an inevitable consequence of human nature. He was innovative in suggesting that scientific medicine might in the future significantly extend the human life span, perhaps even indefinitely, such that future humans only die of accident, murder and suicide rather than simply old age or disease. Nick Bostrom has thus described him as an early transhumanist.

Condorcet's writings were a key contribution to the French Enlightenment, particularly his work on the Idea of Progress. Condorcet believed that through the use of our senses and communication with others, knowledge could be compared and contrasted as a way of analyzing our systems of belief and understanding. None of Condorcet's writings refer to a belief in a religion or a god who intervenes in human affairs. Condorcet instead frequently had written of his faith in humanity itself and its ability to progress with the help of philosophers such as Aristotle. Through this accumulation and sharing of knowledge he believed it was possible for anybody to comprehend all the known facts of the natural world. The enlightenment of the natural world spurred the desire for enlightenment of the social and political world. Condorcet believed that there was no definition of the perfect human existence and thus believed that the progression of the human race would inevitably continue throughout the course of our existence. He envisioned man as continually progressing toward a perfectly utopian society. He believed in the great potential towards growth that man possessed.

However, Condorcet stressed that for this to be a possibility man must unify regardless of race, religion, culture or gender.  To this end, he became a member of the French Société des Amis des Noirs (Society of the Friends of the Blacks). He wrote a set of rules for the Society of the Friends of the Blacks which detailed the reasoning and goals behind the organization along with describing the injustice of slavery and put in a statement calling for the abolition of the slave trade as the first step to true abolition.

Condorcet was also a strong proponent of women's civil rights. He claimed that women were equal to men in nearly every aspect and asked why then should they be debarred from their fundamental civil rights; the few differences that existed were due to the fact that women were limited by their lack of rights. Condorcet even mentioned several women who were more capable than average men, such as Queen Elizabeth and Maria-Theresa.

Civic duty
For Condorcet's republicanism the nation needed enlightened citizens and education needed democracy to become truly public. Democracy implied free citizens, and ignorance was the source of servitude. Citizens had to be provided with the necessary knowledge to exercise their freedom and understand the rights and laws that guaranteed their enjoyment. Although education could not eliminate disparities in talent, all citizens, including women, had the right to free education. In opposition to those who relied on revolutionary enthusiasm to form the new citizens, Condorcet maintained that revolution was not made to last and that revolutionary institutions were not intended to prolong the revolutionary experience but to establish political rules and legal mechanisms that would insure future changes without revolution. In a democratic city there would be no Bastille to be seized. Public education would form free and responsible citizens, not revolutionaries.

Evaluation
Rothschild (2001) argues that Condorcet has been seen since the 1790s as the embodiment of the cold, rational Enlightenment. However she suggests his writings on economic policy, voting, and public instruction indicate different views both of Condorcet and of the Enlightenment. Condorcet was concerned with individual diversity; he was opposed to proto-utilitarian theories; he considered individual independence, which he described as the characteristic liberty of the moderns, to be of central political importance; and he opposed the imposition of universal and eternal principles. His efforts to reconcile the universality of some values with the diversity of individual opinions are of continuing interest. He emphasizes the institutions of civilized or constitutional conflict, recognizes conflicts or inconsistencies within individuals, and sees moral sentiments as the foundation of universal values. His difficulties call into question some familiar distinctions, for example between French, German, and English-Scottish thought, and between the Enlightenment and the counter-Enlightenment. There was substantial continuity between Condorcet's criticism of the economic ideas of the 1760s and the liberal thought of the early 19th century.

The Lycée Condorcet in the rue du Havre, in the 9th arrondissement of Paris, is named in his honour, as are streets in many French cities.

Publications
 Rapport sur le choix d'une unité de mesure, lu à l'Academie des sciences le 19 mars 1791 / imprimé par ordre de l'Assemblée nationale. With Jean-Charles de Borda.

Bibliography

Fictional portrayals

Novels
  City of Darkness, City of Light by Marge Piercy

Movies
 “Flashback” released November 2021

See also
 History of the metre
 Seconds pendulum
 Society of the Friends of Truth

References

Further reading
 Baker, Keith.  Condorcet: From Natural Philosophy to Social Mathematics (1982)
 Cosimo Scarcella, Condorçet. Dottrine politiche e sociali, Lecce, Milella Editore 1980, p. 312.
 Furet, François and Mona Ozouf, eds. A Critical Dictionary of the French Revolution (1989), pp. 204–212
 
 Manuel, Frank Edward. The Prophets of Paris (1962)
 Mount, Ferdinand. The Condor's Head (2007)
 Rothschild, Emma. Economic Sentiments: Adam Smith, Condorcet, and the Enlightenment (2001)
 Schapiro, Jacob Salwyn. Condorcet and the Rise of Liberalism (1962)
 Williams, David. Condorcet and Modernity (Cambridge University Press. 2004)

External links
 
 
 
 
 
 
 Condorcet in the History of Feminism, at the Stanford Encyclopedia of Philosophy
 Outlines of an historical view of the progress of the human mind (1795)
 Contains Sketch for an Historical Picture of the Advances of the Human Mind, slightly modified for easier reading
 The First Essay on the Political Rights of Women. A Translation of Condorcet's Essay "Sur l'admission des femmes aux droits de Cité" (On the Admission of Women to the Rights of Citizenship). By Dr. Alice Drysdale Vickery (with preface and remarks) (Letchworth: Garden City Press, 1912). The Online Library Of Liberty.
 "Condorcet and mesmerism : a record in the history of scepticism", Condorcet manuscript (1784), online and analyzed on Bibnum [click 'à télécharger' for English version].

1743 births
1794 deaths
18th-century French mathematicians
18th-century French writers
18th-century French male writers
Age of Enlightenment
Atheist philosophers
Burials at the Panthéon, Paris
Deputies to the French National Convention
Enlightenment philosophers
Fellows of the American Academy of Arts and Sciences
Feminist philosophers
French abolitionists
French atheists
French biographers
French ethicists
French feminists
French male non-fiction writers
French political scientists
French republicans
French sociologists
Girondins
Honorary members of the Saint Petersburg Academy of Sciences
Proto-feminists
Male feminists
Marquesses of Condorcet
Members of the Académie Française
Members of the French Academy of Sciences
Members of the Legislative Assembly (France)
Members of the Royal Swedish Academy of Sciences
People from Aisne
People killed in the French Revolution
People who died in prison custody during the French Revolution
Philosophers of culture
Philosophers of education
Philosophers of history
Philosophers of religion
Philosophers of science
Political philosophers
Politicians from Hauts-de-France
Rationalists
Social philosophers
Theoretical historians
University of Paris alumni
Voting theorists
Contributors to the Supplement of the Encyclopédie (1776–1780)
18th-century philosophers